Suicide Dolls is a 2010 American film directed by Keith Shaw and starring LaQuita Cleare, Christy Carlson Romano, Heather Tom and Steven Bauer.

Plot 
Desperate for someone to notice them, high school seniors Amber and Jade have always wanted to do something really killer with their lives. One week before graduation, they decide to make a suicide pact and record the last 24 hours of their lives. As they live out their last day, the girls face past demons and reveal secrets that led them down the path of self-destruction. From drugs to abuse to death, they've lived in a warped world that has propelled them into a downward spiral.

Cast 
 LaQuita Cleare as Jade
 Christy Carlson Romano as Amber
 Heather Tom as Lexi
 Steven Bauer as Hank
 Ryan Carnes as Tyler
 Joanna Stancil as Sheila, Amber's Mother

External links 
 
 

2010s teen drama films
2010 films
American teen drama films
Films about suicide
Best Diaspora Feature Africa Movie Academy Award winners
2010 directorial debut films
2010 drama films
2010s English-language films
2010s American films